The Big Eight Conference was an athletic conference of IHSAA Class AAA  high schools located in Southwestern Indiana.  The conference members were small city-based schools located in Daviess, Dubois, Gibson, Knox, Posey, and Warrick counties in Indiana and once included Wabash County in Illinois. The conference ceased operations with the 2019-20 Winter Season as the final spring season was canceled because of the 2020 Coronavirus Outbreak.

History
The Big Eight Conference was created in 1980 when seven members of the Southern Indiana Athletic Conference (Boonville, Jasper, Mount Vernon, Princeton, Tell City, Vincennes Lincoln, and Washington) left to form a new conference with a member of the Pocket Athletic Conference (Gibson Southern).  Gibson Southern left in 1994 to rejoin the PAC. Tell City followed suit to rejoin the PAC in 2001 as well (they had both been in that conference before Tell City joining the SIAC in 1953 when it was a super conference), reducing membership to six schools.  Mount Carmel joined in 2003 to increase the membership to seven. Mount Carmel, located in Illinois, was the only school from outside Indiana to compete in an Indiana athletic conference.

There have been two different members of the conference that captured the 3A boys' basketball title in four successive years. Very rarely has this occurred in the history of the state finals. Washington captured the 2007–08, 2009–10, and 2010–11 titles, and Princeton captured the 2008-09 State Title.

The conference's demise was set in motion by the Illinois High School Association member schools initially voting in December 2018 to establish a district football format (but repealing it one year later), meaning Mount Carmel would not be able to schedule all of the other conference members in that sport. The conference responded by voting to remove the school in 2020, while the school voted to leave before the 2019–20 school year. This set off a chain reaction, as Jasper and Vincennes Lincoln were accepted to return to the SIAC for 2020, and a week later, the PAC voted to accept the remaining four schools, including two former members, Boonville and Mount Vernon, effectively ending the conference.

Member schools

Former members

State championships

Boonville Pioneers (1)
2006 Softball (3A)

Jasper Wildcats (8)
1949 Boys' Basketball
1996 Baseball
1997 Baseball
1998 Baseball (3A)
1999 Boys' Tennis
2000 Baseball (3A)
2001 Football (4A)
2006 Baseball (3A)

Mount Carmel Golden Aces (3)
1927 Boys' Basketball (Illinois)
1981 Football (3A) (Illinois)
2010 Boys' Golf (1A) (Illinois)

Mount Vernon Wildcats (0)

Princeton Community Tigers (2)
 2009 Boys' Basketball (3A)
 2015 Girls' Basketball (3A)

Vincennes Lincoln Alices (3)
1923 Boys' Basketball
1981 Boys' Basketball
2002 Baseball (3A)

Washington Hatchets (9)
1914 Boys' Track
1915 Boys' Track
1930 Boys' Basketball
1941 Boys' Basketball
1942 Boys' Basketball
2005 Boys' Basketball (3A)
2008 Boys' Basketball (3A)
2010 Boys' Basketball (3A)
2011 Boys' Basketball (3A)

Conference Championships
Sources:

Football

Boys Basketball

Girls Basketball

Note: Big Eight Conference championships were determined by a single round-robin among the active members. The Big Eight Conference did not break ties in the standings for championship purposes, instead co-championships were awarded.

Neighboring Conferences
Pocket Athletic Conference
Southern Indiana Athletic Conference
Blue Chip Conference
Patoka Lake Conference

References

 
Illinois high school sports conferences
Indiana high school athletic conferences
Southwestern Indiana
Education in Daviess County, Indiana
Education in Dubois County, Indiana
Education in Gibson County, Indiana
Education in Knox County, Indiana
Education in Posey County, Indiana
Education in Wabash County, Illinois
Education in Warrick County, Indiana